A medicine bag is usually a small pouch, worn by some Indigenous peoples of the Americas, that contains sacred items. A personal medicine bag may contain objects that symbolize personal well-being and tribal identity. Traditionally, medicine bags are worn under the clothing. Their contents are private, and often of a personal and religious nature.

See also
 Medicine man
 Midewiwin
 Medicine wheel

References

Bags
Native American religion
Religious objects
Traditional medicine
Spiritualism
Amulets
Talismans